The following is a timeline of the history of the photo messaging software Snapchat.

Basic timeline

Full timeline

See also 
 Timeline of Instagram
 Timeline of Twitter
 Timeline of Facebook
 Timeline of Pinterest
 Timeline of social media

References

Snapchat
Snap Inc.